The Scout and Guide movement in Saudi Arabia is served by
 Saudi Arabian Boy Scouts Association, member of the World Organization of the Scout Movement
 Although Saudi Arabia does have a Guiding organization, the Girl Guides of Saudi Arabia, work towards World Association of Girl Guides and Girl Scouts membership recognition remains unclear.

External links